Trombidium carpaticum is a species of mite in the genus Trombidium in the family Trombidiidae. It is found in France and Romania.

Name
The species name refers to the Carpathian Mountains.

References
 Synopsis of the described Arachnida of the World: Trombidiidae

Trombidiidae
Animals described in 1950
Arachnids of Europe